

45001–45100 

|-id=027
| 45027 Cosquer ||  || Henri Cosquer (born 1950), a professional French diver who discovered the Cosquer Cave near Marseille, France in 1985. The cave's entrance is below the Mediterranean sea level and contains numerous cave painting, some of them over 27,000 years old. The asteroid's name was proposed by G. Burki. || 
|-id=073
| 45073 Doyanrose ||  || Doyan Rose Ruthroff (1923–1974), mother of American astronomer John Ruthroff, who discovered this minor planet. || 
|}

45101–45200 

|-bgcolor=#f2f2f2
| colspan=4 align=center | 
|}

45201–45300 

|-id=261
| 45261 Decoen ||  || Yvette Decoen (born 1951), a Swiss physics teacher and friend of Swiss amateur astronomer Stefano Sposetti who discovered this minor planet. || 
|-id=298
| 45298 Williamon ||  || Richard Williamon (born 1946), American astronomer, researcher of eclipsing stars and member of the IAU. He serves as director of the Fernbank Science Center with its observatory and planetarium in Atlanta (IAU).  || 
|-id=299
| 45299 Stivell ||  || Alan Stivell (born 1944), a French and Breton musician and a master of the Celtic harp. || 
|-id=300
| 45300 Thewrewk ||  || Aurél Ponori Thewrewk (1921–2014), Hungarian astronomical historian, director of the Urania Public Observatory and the Budapest Planetarium, honorary president of the Hungarian Astronomical Association(hu) || 
|}

45301–45400 

|-id=305
| 45305 Paulscherrer ||  || Paul Scherrer, Swiss physicist and mathematician || 
|}

45401–45500 

|-id=492
| 45492 Sławomirbreiter ||  || Sławomir Breiter (born 1963) is a professor at the Poznań Astronomical Observatory in Poland. His work focuses on celestial mechanics, including contributions to the development of analytical and semi-analytical theories of the asteroidal YORP effect and the study of orbital dynamics || 
|-id=500
| 45500 Motegi ||  || Hiromitsu Motegi (born 1960), a Japanese amateur astronomer and a promoter and instructor of astronomy, especially to children. Through his web site, he also collaborates with other Japanese amateur astronomers (HP). || 
|}

45501–45600 

|-id=509
| 45509 Robertward ||  || Robert Ward (born 1976) was inspired by his sighting of a fireball from his home in Bullhead City, Arizona in 1989. He has gone on to find nearly 6 , 000 meteorites in 600 localities on six continents, including the recovery of over 20 witnessed falls. || 
|-id=510
| 45510 Kashuba ||  || John H. Kashuba (born 1947) is a meteorite collector and photographer whose artful high-resolution images of meteorites in thin section appear in books, magazines and online, including his Micro Visions column in Meteorite Times. With Belgian chemist Roger Warin, he authored the Centerpiece column in Meteorite magazine. || 
|-id=511
| 45511 Anneblack ||  || Anne Black (born 1944) is one of the founders of the International Meteorite Collector's Association and served three terms as President. She has translated numerous books and articles about meteorites from her native French into English for publication in the U.S. || 
|-id=512
| 45512 Holcomb ||  || Amasa Holcomb (1787–1875) was a self taught American astronomer and optician who fabricated surveying instruments and astronomical telescopes of Herschelian configuration up to 254 mm aperture. Two of his instruments are currently at the Smithsonian Institution. || 
|-id=517
| 45517 Jett ||  || Jacob (born 1986) and Caitlin Jett (born 1986) are a husband and wife team of amateur astronomers who not only observe together but have fabricated much of their own astronomical equipment. Using this equipment they also conduct educational outreach. Jacob is a professional paleontologist in Colorado. || 
|-id=518
| 45518 Larrykrozel ||  || Larry Krozel (1964–2020), a planetarium lecturer at the Treworgy Planetarium in Mystic Seaport, Connecticut. He could explain complex astronomical concepts to visitors of all ages and was an active member of the International Meteorite Collectors Association and the AAVSO Solar Section. || 
|-id=519
| 45519 Triebold ||  || Michael Triebold (born 1953), an American paleontologist, preparator of museum fossils, and founder of Triebold Paleontology Incorporated. He was awarded the 2019 Charles H. Sternberg Medal by the Association of Applied Paleontological Sciences for "contributions to paleontology" and for "fostering cooperation and understanding between professional, amateur and academic paleontologists". || 
|-id=580
| 45580 Renéracine ||  || René Racine (born 1939), a Canadian astronomer who is an expert in globular clusters, galaxies, astronomical instruments and adaptive optics. He has been a long-time director of the Mont Mégantic Observatory and Canada–France–Hawaii Telescope. || 
|}

45601–45700 

|-id=640
| 45640 Mikepuzio ||  || Mike Puzio (born 2004) is an Eagle Scout. He suggested the name for Bennu, target of the OSIRIS-REx mission. He has given many presentations about the mission as an OSIRIS-REx Ambassador. || 
|-id=685
| 45685 Torrycoppin ||  || Torry Coppin (1950–1993) was an amateur astronomer and an electronics engineer for radio stations in the Sarasota, Florida area. || 
|-id=687
| 45687 Pranverahyseni ||  || Pranvera Hyseni (born 1995) is the founder and Director of Astronomy Outreach of Kosovo, the largest non-profit astronomy outreach organization in that country. She is an enthusiastic ambassador for Kosovo amateur astronomy. || 
|-id=688
| 45688 Lawrencestacey ||  || K. Lawrence Stacey (born 1950) is a long-time amateur astronomer, first as a youth in Southfield, Michigan and later in Asheville, North Carolina. He specializes in the observation of multiple stars. || 
|-id=689
| 45689 Brianjones ||  || Brian Jones (born 1953) is a founding member of Bradford Astronomical Society. Known for writing many articles for newspapers, magazines and journals (scientific and general-interest), he has also penned over 18 books which have covered a range of astronomy and space-related topics. || 
|-id=692
| 45692 Poshyachinda ||  || Saran Poshyachinda (born 1964) is Executive Director of the National Astronomical Research Institute of Thailand. Encouraging public interest in astronomy, he was crucial in the construction of the Thai National Observatory, regional observatories for the public throughout Thailand and a 40-m radio telescope. || 
|-id=699
| 45699 Maryalba ||  || Mary Alba (born 1957) is the daughter of Walter and Peggy Haas, founders of the Association of Lunar and Planetary Observers (ALPO). On her own she has been a strong supporter of the organization, encouraging observers and taking her displays of ALPO history to national astronomical meetings. || 
|-id=700
| 45700 Levi-Setti ||  || Riccardo Levi-Setti (born 1928), a world-renowned expert on trilobites. || 
|}

45701–45800 

|-id=737
| 45737 Benita || 2000 HB || Benita Segal, American physician and wife of the discoverer || 
|-id=752
| 45752 Venditti ||  || Flaviane Venditti (born 1980) is an observatory scientist at the Arecibo Observatory, Puerto Rico, who specializes in radar observations of near-Earth asteroids, impact mitigation techniques, and spacecraft dynamics. || 
|}

45801–45900 

|-id=846
| 45846 Avdellidou ||  || Chrysoula Avdellidou (born 1987) has contributed significantly to knowledge of hypervelocity impact physics with experimental, theoretical and lunar flash observations. She showed that collisions can implant projectile material on small body surfaces, clarifying previously unexplained observations. || 
|-id=847
| 45847 Gartrelle ||  || Gordon Gartrelle (born 1955) received his Ph.D. from the University of North Dakota. His primary studies are of D-type asteroids, their potential parent bodies, and their mineralogy. || 
|-id=855
| 45855 Susumuyoshitomi ||  || Susumu Yoshitomi (born 1948) is one of the directors of the Japan Space Forum. He contributed greatly to the construction of Bisei Spaceguard Center. || 
|-id=878
| 45878 Sadaoaoki ||  || Sadao Aoki (born 1962) is one of the staff of the Japan Space Forum. For many years, he has contributed greatly to the operation and facility maintenance of the Bisei Spaceguard Center. || 
|}

45901–46000 

|-bgcolor=#f2f2f2
| colspan=4 align=center | 
|}

References 

045001-046000